Folkestone’s outdoor public art exhibition – Folkestone Artworks – is the UK’s largest urban outdoor contemporary art exhibition, consisting of 74 contemporary artworks by 46 artists in scenic locations around the town and its coastline. Artworks include those by  Lubaina Himid, Tracey Emin, Yoko Ono and Antony Gormley. Folkestone Artworks is refreshed every three years, as permanent works commissioned for the Folkestone Triennial are incorporated. Folkestone Artworks is maintained and cared for by Creative Folkestone on behalf of the Roger De Haan Charitable Trust. 

Commissioned artists and their artworks often respond directly to the town of Folkestone itself and with the specific site in mind, reflecting both the town and its community whilst also reflecting broader themes.  Creative Folkestone’s CEO, Alastair Upton notes that the artists “work with the grain of the history and the grain of the land to make something and people can come and read that but of course they’re artists so there is a universality". 

Notable artworks reflecting this ethos include Sol Calero’s Casa Anacaona,  built by the artist working with members of the community as part of the Creative Folkestone Triennial 2017. Lubaina Himid’s Jelly Mould Pavilion, a public pavilion commissioned in 2007, reveals the town’s history with themes of universality whilst also offering shade, opportunities for conversation and invites contemplation on a sandy beach looking out to the sea. Pilar Quinteros's Janus Fortress Folkestone artwork launched in May 2021 is part of the 2021 Folkestone Triennial, 'The Plot' and England's Creative Coast. 

Some of the artworks  are more of a personal nature, including Tracey Emin’s Baby Things -  a seven-part collection of bronze sculptures, including a teddy bear that sits on a platform at Folkestone Central railway station. Mark Wallinger’s Folk Stones reflects a more universal theme, consisting of 19,240 numbered stones, the exact number of soldiers killed on the first day of the Battle of the Somme in 1916.

A volunteer-led project, Online Placemaking, resulted in all 72 Artworks being geo-located on Google Maps for the first time in March 2021.

Artists and Artworks

References

Art exhibitions in the United Kingdom